Merchant Express Aviation was a cargo airline flying out of Lagos, Nigeria.

Fleet
Merchant Express Aviation used only one aircraft, a Boeing 707 that flew regularly from Africa to European cities, such as Ostend, Belgium. The aircraft's registration was 5N-MXX.

Brief history
Merchant Express Aviation flew around the 1990s. Just like many other cargo airlines from around the world, the company gave the venerable 707 jet another chance to fly for a company (other cargo airlines use the DC-8 also). Competition from such European cargo airlines like Cargo Lion, Cargolux and Germany's DHL, combined with the poor economic situation of Nigeria during the time (which also had to do with Nigeria Airways' demise) to precipitate the cargo airline company's demise before the 2000s had arrived.

Code data

ICAO Code: MXX
Callsign: MERCHANT

Destinations
From Lagos to many European cities.

External links
1990s list of airlines operating cargo flights to the united kingdom

Defunct airlines of Nigeria
Defunct companies based in Lagos
1990s establishments in Nigeria